Phtheochroa lonnvei is a species of moth of the family Tortricidae. It is found in Ethiopia.

The wingspan is about 25 mm.

Etymology
The species is named in honour of Ole J. Lønnve, who collected the specimen.

References

Endemic fauna of Ethiopia
Moths described in 2010
Phtheochroa